Poetry of the Day After is Taiwanese Mandopop rock band Mayday's seventh studio album. It was released on 23 October 2008 by Rock Records and B'in Music. The music video for "如煙" (Like Smoke) features Taiwanese actor James Wen.

The tracks "突然好想你" (Suddenly Missing You), "你不是真正的快樂" (You Are Not Genuinely Happy) and "出頭天" (Breakthrough Day) are listed at number 8, 36 and 80 respectively on Hit Fm Taiwan's Hit Fm Annual Top 100 Singles Chart (Hit-Fm年度百首單曲) for 2008. The track "突然好想你" (Suddenly Missing You) won one of the Top 10 Songs of the Year at the 2009 HITO Radio Music Awards presented by Taiwanese radio station Hit FM.

According to Taiwan's G-Music chart the album is the fourth best selling album in Taiwan in 2009. It was also nominated for several awards at the 20th Golden Melody Awards, including Best Song for "你不是真正的快樂" (You Are Not Genuinely Happy)  and "後青春期的詩" (Poetry of the Day After). It won Best Band for their work on this album.

Track listing

Charts

Awards

References

2008 albums
Mayday (Taiwanese band) albums